is a Japanese football player. He plays for Tokyo Musashino City FC.

Playing career
Kaneko was born in Utsunomiya on April 8, 1983. After graduating from high school, he joined J2 League club Mito HollyHock in 2002. He got an opportunity to play from first season. In April 2004, he was loaned to Regional Leagues club Grulla Morioka with teammate Shogo Sakurai. He scored 25 goals in 10 matches. He returned to HollyHock in 2005. In 2006, he moved to his local club Tochigi SC in Japan Football League (JFL). However he could not play many matches. In 2008, he moved to JFL club Yokogawa Musashino (later Tokyo Musashino City FC). Although he played many matches in 2008, he could not play many matches in 2009 and retired end of 2009 season. In 2014, he returned as player at Tokyo Musashino City FC.

Club statistics

References

External links

1983 births
Living people
Association football people from Tochigi Prefecture
Japanese footballers
J2 League players
Japan Football League players
Mito HollyHock players
Iwate Grulla Morioka players
Tochigi SC players
Tokyo Musashino United FC players
Association football forwards